This is a list of the works of fiction which have won the Spur Award for Best Novel of the West:

 1953 - Best Historical Novel: "The Wheel and the Hearth" by Lucia Moore
 1954 - Best Historical Novel: "Journey by the River" by John Prescott
 1955 - No Award given
 1956 - Best Historical Novel: "Generations of Men" by John Clinton Hunt
 1957 - Best Historical Novel: "Silver Mountain" by Dan Cushman
 1958 - Best Historical Novel: "The Fancher Train" by Amelia Bean
 1959 - Best Historical Novel: "The Buffalo Soldier" by John Prebble
 1960 - Best Historical Novel: "From Where the Sun Now Stands" by Will Henry
 1961 - Best Historical Novel: "The Winter War" by William Wister Haines
 1962 - Best Historical Novel: "Moontrap" by Don Berry
 1963 - Best Historical Novel: "Gates of the Mountains" by Will Henry (2)
 1964 - Best Historical Novel: "Indian Fighter" by F.F. Halloran
 1965 - Best Historical Novel: (tied) "Gold in California" by Todhunter Ballard & "Mountain Man" by Vardis Fisher
 1966 - Best Historical Novel: "Hellfire Jackson" by Garland Roark & Charles Thomas
 1967 - Best Historical Novel: "The Wolf is My Brother by Chad Oliver
 1968 - Best Historical Novel: "The Red Sabbath" by Lewis B. Patten
 1969 - Best Historical Novel: "The White Man's Road" by Benjamin Capps
 1970-71 No Award given
 1972 - Best Historical Novel: "Chiricahua" by Will Henry (3)
 1973-75 No Award given
 1976 - Best Historical Novel: "The Kincaids" by Matt Braun
 1977 - Best Historical Novel: "Swimming Man Burning" by Terrence Kilpatrick
 1978-80 No Award given
 1981 - Best Historical Novel: "Aces and Eights" by Loren D. Estleman
 1982 - Best Historical Novel: Ride the Wind by Lucia St. Clair Robson
 1983 - Best Historical Novel: "Sam Bass" by Bryan Woolley
 1984 - Best Historical Novel: "Gone the Dreams and Dancing" by Douglas C. Jones
 1985 - Best Historical Novel: "The Snowblind Moon" by John Byrne Cooke
 1986 - Best Historical Novel: "Roman" by Douglas C. Jones (2)
 1987 - Best Historical Novel: "Wanderer Springs" by Robert Flynn
 1988 - Best Novel of The West: "The Homesman" by Glendon Swarthout
 1989 - Best Novel of The West: "Panther In The Sky" by James Alexander Thom
 1990 - Best Novel of The West: "Home Mountain" by Jeanne Williams
 1991 - Best Novel of The West: "The Medicine Horn" by Jory Sherman
 1992 - Best Novel of The West: "Slaughter" by Elmer Kelton
 1993 - Best Novel of The West: "Empire of Bones" by Jeff Long
 1994 - Best Novel of The West: "The Far Canyon" by Elmer Kelton (2)
 1995 - Best Novel of The West: "Stone Song: A Novel of The Life of Crazy Horse" by Win Blevins
 1996 - Best Novel of The West: "Sierra" by Richard S. Wheeler
 1997: W.W.A. changed the time-frame from 'year published' to 'year award presented'
 1998 - Best Novel of The West: "Comanche Moon" by Larry McMurtry
 1999 - Best Novel of The West: "The All-True Travels and Adventures of Liddie Newton" by Jane Smiley
 2000 - Best Novel of The West: "Prophet Annie" by Ellen Recknor
 2001 - Best Novel of The West: "The Gates of The Alamo" by Stephen Harrigan
 2002 - Best Novel of The West: "The Miracle Life of Edgar Mint" by Brady Udall
 2003 - Best Novel of The West: "Perma Red" by Debra Magpie Earling
 2004 - Best Novel of The West: "So Wild A Dream" by Win Blevins (2)
 2005 - Best Novel of The West: "People of The Raven" by Kathleen O'Neal Gear and W. Michael Gear
 2006 - Best Novel of The West: "High Country: A Novel" by Willard Wyman (which also won for Best First Novel)
 2007 - Best Western Long Novel: "The Night Journal" by Elizabeth Crook
 2008 - Best Western Long Novel: "The God of Animals" By Aryn Kyle
 2009 - Best Western Long Novel: "Shavetail" by Thomas Cobb
 2010 - Best Western Long Novel: "Echoes of Glory" by Robert Flynn (2)
 only five authors have won it on more than one occasion: Will Henry (3): 1960, 1963, 1972; (2) each for: Win Blevins 1995, 2004; Robert Flynn 1987, 2010; Douglas C. Jones 1984, 1986; Elmer Kelton 1992, 1994

American literary awards